Gusztáv Menczer (born 15 October 1959) is a Hungarian former sprinter who specialised in the 400 metres. He represented his country at the 1983 World Championships and 1989 World Indoor Championships.

International competitions

1Did not finish in the semifinals

Personal bests
Outdoor
100 metres – 10.48 (+1.8 m/s, Budapest 1993)
200 metres – 20.75 (+1.8 m/s, Budapest 1986)
400 metres – 45.81 (Kobe 1985)
Long jump – 7.59 (Budapest 1981)
Indoor
200 metres – 21.62 (Vienna 1985)
400 metres – 46.96 (Budapest 1988)
Long jump – 7.46 (Budapest 1982)

References

All-Athletics profile

1959 births
Living people
Hungarian male sprinters
World Athletics Championships athletes for Hungary